"The Alternate Side" is the 28th episode of the sitcom Seinfeld. The episode was the 11th episode of the show's third season, and aired on December 4, 1991.

The episode was written by Larry David and Bill Masters, and was directed by Tom Cherones. The idea for the Woody Allen story came from David's experiences working with Allen; he briefly appeared in Radio Days (1987) and New York Stories (1989). He would later have a lead role in Whatever Works (2009). The episode repeatedly uses the line "these pretzels are making me thirsty", one of the first popular lines to emerge from the show, which inspired fans to throw pretzels during Jerry Seinfeld's stand-up comedy performances during the few months following its premiere.

In 2012, Jerry Seinfeld identified this as his least-favorite episode, saying the stroke patient storyline made him feel uncomfortable.

Plot
Jerry's car is stolen and he is able to have a conversation with the thief (voiced by Larry David) on the car phone. Kramer asks the thief to retrieve his gloves and send them back to him. George takes a job moving people's cars from one side of the street to the other, covering Sid's shifts while he travels to visit his sick nephew, to comply with alternate side parking regulations. Elaine cares for her 66-year-old boyfriend, who has a stroke just before she is about to break up with him. Kramer gets a single line in a Woody Allen film: "These pretzels are making me thirsty."

Overwhelmed by his new job, George causes a car collision and traffic jam, making it take longer for the ambulance to reach Elaine's boyfriend, causing additional neural damage that could have been prevented. Also due to the delays caused by George, a disgruntled Woody Allen says that he may never shoot a movie in New York City again. Additionally, George's poor performance causes many of Sid's long-time customers to cancel. That results in Sid being unable to finance his nephew's operation to save his foot, so it will have to be amputated. While filming his scene during the Allen movie, Kramer slams his beer mug on the bar and accidentally injures Allen with a flying shard of glass. He is fired from the set. Kramer gets his gloves back from the car thief but has no information about the car, which irritates Jerry.

Critical reception 
The New York Post listed the "pretzels" line as one of "Seinfeld's 25 greatest contributions to the English language." An article about Elaine's boyfriends, meanwhile, suggests that in the context of Woody Allen films, "perhaps Elaine's strange relationship with Owen, a senior citizen at 66, can be explained as some kind of Manhattan reference.". Another article, while criticizing Elaine's relationship with an older man as inappropriate, argued that it "went with her characterization to be superficial enough to choose men like this".

References

External links
 

Seinfeld (season 3) episodes
1991 American television episodes
Television episodes written by Larry David